Hang Your Dog in the Wind is a 1997 American film. The first feature film of Brian Flemming, it was shot in black and white and Super 16 in 1993 then blown up to 35mm. Although it was not accepted by either the Sundance Film Festival or the Slamdance Film Festival in 1997, it was released as part of film festival created by Flemming and associates,  "The 1997 Slumdance Experience."

See also
Brian Flemming
The God Who Wasn't There

References

External links
 

1997 films
American independent films
1990s English-language films
1990s American films